Shiromani Akali Dal (Panthic) is a defunct Indian political party in Punjab.It is one of several hard-line splinter group, formed as a result of the split in Shiromani Akali Dal in 1991. SAD(P) was formed in 1990. It is led by Jasbir Singh Rode. The party was a Sikh-centered political party in the Indian state of Punjab.

In January 1992 SAD (Panthik) merged with the Shiromani Akali Dal (Longowal). Amarinder however felt marginalized, and in February 1997 the SAD (Panthik) was re-launched. On 12 September 1997 SAD (Panthik) merged with the Indian National Congress and Amarinder Singh became the president of Punjab Pradesh Congress Committee (PCC) replacing Rajinder Kaur Bhattal.

References

Sikh politics
Political parties in Punjab, India
Sikh political parties
Political schisms
1990 establishments in Punjab, India
Political parties established in 1990
Shiromani Akali Dal